Crockett County is located in the U.S. state of Tennessee. As of the 2020 census, the population was 13,911. Its county seat is Alamo. Crockett County is included in the Jackson, TN Metropolitan Statistical Area.

History
Crockett County was formed in 1871 from portions of Haywood, Madison, Dyer and Gibson counties. It is named in honor of David Crockett (1786–1836), frontier humorist, soldier, Tennessee state legislator and U.S. congressman, and defender of the Alamo.

In 1876, in what apparently was a political rivalry gone bad, Crockett County Sheriff R. G. Harris and 19 other unidentified men removed four black men from the county jail and beat them, killing one of them. The sheriff was arrested.  In United States v. Harris (1883), the Supreme Court ruled that the Sheriff could not be prosecuted under federal law.
https://www.genealogy.com/forum/surnames/topics/wells/9856/

Geography

Adjacent counties
Gibson County (northeast)
Madison County (southeast)
Haywood County (south)
Lauderdale County (west)
Dyer County (northwest)

State protected areas
Horns Bluff Refuge (part)

Demographics

2020 census

As of the 2020 United States census, there were 13,911 people, 5,491 households, and 3,700 families residing in the county.

2000 census
As of the census of 2000, there were 14,532 people, 5,632 households, and 4,066 families residing in the county.  The population density was 55 people per square mile (21/km2).  There were 6,138 housing units at an average density of 23 per square mile (9/km2).  The racial makeup of the county was 81.96% White, 14.37% Black or African American, 0.20% Native American, 0.06% Asian, 2.79% from other races, and 0.63% from two or more races.  5.46% of the population were Hispanic or Latino of any race.

There were 5,632 households, out of which 32.70% had children under the age of 18 living with them, 56.40% were married couples living together, 11.80% had a female householder with no husband present, and 27.80% were non-families. 25.30% of all households were made up of individuals, and 11.50% had someone living alone who was 65 years of age or older.  The average household size was 2.53 and the average family size was 3.01.

In the county, the population was spread out, with 25.10% under the age of 18, 8.10% from 18 to 24, 28.30% from 25 to 44, 22.70% from 45 to 64, and 15.80% who were 65 years of age or older.  The median age was 37 years. For every 100 females there were 93.30 males.  For every 100 females age 18 and over, there were 90.70 males.

The median income for a household in the county was $30,015, and the median income for a family was $36,713. Males had a median income of $27,436 versus $21,073 for females. The per capita income for the county was $14,600.  About 13.20% of families and 16.90% of the population were below the poverty line, including 19.50% of those under age 18 and 17.90% of those age 65 or over.

Media

Radio
 WTJS Good News 93.1 - WTJS - Alamo - Contemporary Christian Music

Newspaper
The Crockett Times is the paper of record in Crockett County, Tennessee. Locally owned and operated, The Times publishes articles on Crockett County communities of Alamo, Bells, Crockett Mills, Friendship, Gadsden and Maury City, as well as surrounding areas. The Times also publicizes legal notices such as notice to creditors, foreclosure notices, adoption notices, and beer permits.
The newspaper is published once a week on Thursday. The Times began publishing in 1873 as the Crockett County Sentinel. In 1933, The Sentinel merged with two other newspapers and was renamed the Crockett Times.

Communities

Cities
Bells
Friendship

Towns
Alamo (county seat)
Gadsden
Maury City

Unincorporated communities
 Cairo
 Crockett Mills
 Frog Jump
 Fruitvale
 Midway
 Shady Grove

Points of interest 
 Louise Pearson Memorial Arboretum

Politics

From 1960 to 2000, Crockett was a swing county; since 2004 it has been trending increasingly Republican.

See also
National Register of Historic Places listings in Crockett County, Tennessee

References

External links

 The Crockett Reporter
 Crockett County Chamber of Commerce
 Crockett County Schools
 Crockett County, TNGenWeb – genealogy resources 

 
1871 establishments in Tennessee
Populated places established in 1871
West Tennessee
Davy Crockett